RCRC may refer to:

Organizations
 Religious Coalition for Reproductive Choice 
 Royal Commission for Riyadh (RCRC: Royal Commission for Riyadh City), Saudi Arabia
 Red Cross and Red Crescent (RC/RC), see International Red Cross and Red Crescent Movement
 River City Rowing Club at Washington Lake (California)

Other uses
 Residual Cashflow Reallocation Cashflow, calculated for electricity billing in the UK

See also

 RC (disambiguation)
 RC2 (disambiguation)